Hum Sub Umeed Se Hain is a political satire show, which features funny segments on Pakistani political issues.
Hosted by Saba Qamar, Fiza Ali and Mehwish Hayat, the show was divided into 3 versions. The first one is 'Midweek Version' Hosted by Mehwish Hayat, the second is 'Extra Version' Hosted By Fiza Ali and the third is 'Weekend Version' hosted by notable Pakistani actress Saba Qamar. Earlier this show was also hosted by actress Veena Malik, Sara Chaudry, Hira Salman, Kiran Tabeer, Mathira and Arisha Razi. This show has been on the air since July 2007. Due to its popularity, it aired till 2015 and was finished in 2015 due to ban on Geo Entertainment.

Production
It is written by the Pakistani TV programs screenwriter and humorist Muhammad Younis.

Plot 
The program mostly makes fun of corrupt and lazy politicians who always somehow sneak into the political process and get elected. This show's TV artists try to portray them in their situational comedy. The show also covers current affairs topics in Pakistan in a humorous way. The show mocks the Pakistani politicians and presents the Pakistani political issues in funny segments. In addition to other characters, each episode has a guest, who mocks an international or national politician. It usually deals with current events. It was also hosted by Nabeel And Khwaja Aslam in 2004-2005.

Series Overview

Hosts and Cast
 Veena Malik as host (Host of the show for 2007 and 2008 TV season)
 Saba Qamar as Resham (Host of the show for 2009-2013, 2015 TV seasons)
 Meera as herself (Host of the show for 2014 TV season)
 Fiza Ali as News host (Host few episodes)
 Mehwish Hayat as Newscaster (Host few episodes)
 Arisha Razi as Nunni (Host few episodes)
 Mathira as News interviewer (Host few episodes)
 Naseem Vicky as Naseem (Stand-up Comedian)
 Hira Mani as Advertisement lady (Appeared in few episodes)
 Rubina Arif as Firdos Ashiq Awan (Appeared in some episodes)
 Adla Khan as Morning show host (Appeared in some episodes)
 Uroosa Qureshi as Meera interviewer (Appeared in some episodes)
 Alif Noon (Stand-up Comedian)

Segments

Ek Din Hum Sub Umeed Se Hain Ke Saath
News Fuse
News Muse
Nokri.com
As You Wish
After News
After Shocks
B-Ads
Bezti Idol
C.I.D
Cross MatchCoffee With SheikhMeera PointPakistan Avengers
Parody Song
Punch PolicyPhelay Tolo Phir BoloSignal Banned
Side News
Sochna Vi Naa
Show TimeShow ShahC News
Bachay Ghair Siyassi Hoty Hain
Boiling Point
Broken News
Bezti Idol
Extra TezFood NewsFuture AdsFinal SongModel Siyast DanTop FlopTicket Tantrum
Totkay
Rap Battle
Rigging Point
Returning Point
Round The Clock
Z Man
O Teri
Films
Farmao Farmao
Lie Detector
Love 2013
Love 2014
Love 2015
Load Shedding Time
Pakistan Idle 
Yeh Bandhan Tu Iqtadar Bandhan Hai
Hasna Mana Hai
Old Is Gold
Laugh LineGupshupInklaab
Billo OnlineSur NaakSuper 4
Sur Tiiter Bitter (Sur Kshetra)
Geo P.I.R.
 Geo F.I.R. 2050
Under Score

References

External links
Official Website

Urdu-language television shows
Pakistani comedy television series
Political mass media in Pakistan
Geo TV original programming